University of Gezira, or U of G, is a public university located  in Wad Medani, Sudan.
It is a member of the Federation of the Universities of the Islamic World.

History
The University Of Gezira (U. of G.) was founded in 1975 as a public university, and the first Sudanese university outside of Khartoum by the former mayor then turned governor Abdelrahim Mahmoud, along with the help of president Gaafar Nimeiry in the city of Wad Madani. The university is near one of the biggest agricultural projects in Africa – the Gezira Project, historically the backbone of the Sudanese economy.

 Initially, there were only a handful of schools, but today the university has expanded to fourteen schools and four institutes. At its prime in the late 20th century, the university was seen as one of the top institutions in the country, at times even rivaling the University of Khartoum. One of its most famous members of faculty being Former Minister of Finance and Economic Planning, Dr. Ibrahim El-Bedawi.

History and development 
The first university guide quotes causes and justifications for establishing the University of Gezira as follows: "The mission of the universities is to seek science and knowledge, reveal the secrets of nature, build human civilization in all its dimensions, assess the balance of justice, support the inherent spiritual values, raise the word of truth and prosperity, eliminate the injustice and corruption, build the mind and conscience of mankind, develop expertise and skills, enrich and refine the talents, and achieve all that through constructive cooperation in an atmosphere of brotherhood, love and fidelity".

The University of Gezira was established to serve the community, and to link education with the requirements of development and make it more relevant to human and environmental needs. This is evident from the content of educational mission entrusted to it and identified in its function "to study the environment of Sudan and in particular the rural environment, to identify the issues and conduct research around it". With this concept, the University of Gezira began its path exploring problems of society, training professional cadre capable of utilizing the potential of the rural areas of Sudan and conduct basic and applied scientific research to serve the rural community.

The university of Gezira is currently spread in nine campuses in the Gezira state and one campus in the northern state. Campuses in the city of Wad Medani are the University City in Neshaishiba, Elrazi Campus and Hantoub Campus. The University City in Neshaishiba is located in the northern outskirt of the city of Wad Medani, and includes the university administration, central deanships, Faculty of Agricultural Sciences, Engineering and Technology, Economics and Rural Development, Textiles, and the National Institute for Development of Horticultural Exports, the Sugar Institute and the University of Gezira Farm. Elrazi campus, is located in the southern part of the city of Wad Medani and includes Faculties of Medicine, Pharmacy, Applied Medical Sciences, Medical Laboratory Science, Dentistry, and Mathematical and Computer Sciences, and the Water Management and Irrigation Institute, The National Cancer Institute and the National Oilseeds Processing and Research Institute, in addition to the Education Promotion Center, University Press and University of Gezira Consulting House. The campus in Hantoub houses the Faculty of Education - Hantoub and the Institute of Islamization of Knowledge.

There are six other University campuses in different locations in the Gezira state, including the Faculty of Educational Sciences which is located in Elkamlin town, the Faculty of Education – El Hassahissa located in El Hassahisa town, the Faculty of Animal Production located in Elmanagil, the Faculty of Health and Environmental Sciences located in Elhush in the South Gezira Locality and the Faculty of Developmental Studies located in Umm Elgora Locality. (fig 2). At the Locality of Wad Medani in addition to the city of Wad Medani campuses there is the Faculty of Communication Sciences in Fadasi (Wad Medani suburb). and at Eldaba town (Northern state) there is the National Institute for Desert studies.

The number of students enrolled in the University of Gezira has reached 18,221 students registered for bachelor degree, 3350 for technical Diploma and 3622 students in postgraduate programs. This has coincided with the development of the infrastructure of Faculties and Institutes and furnishing.

Colleges
Faculty of Medicine
Faculty of Pharmacy
Faculty of Dentistry
Faculty of Medical Laboratories
Faculty of Engineering and Technology
Faculty of Mathematical Computer Science
Faculty of Education
Faculty of Communication Science
Faculty of Economics and Rural Area Development
Faculty of Textile
Faculty of Animal Production
Faculty of Agriculture and Natural Resources
Faculty of Health Sciences and Environment
Faculty of Applied Medical Science

Faculty of Medicine
The school is a home for a WHO collaborating center, a core center for the public health education and research. The school model of community-oriented education has been contributing to the development of health awareness in the region. It has also grown to be a highly active research center for endemic diseases such as malaria and bilharziasis. Both of which are water-born diseases mostly related to agricultural activities of the region residents.

The teaching hospital of the faculty of medicine is the largest hospital outside Khartoum. It serves the whole region, acting as a main referral center. A separate children's hospital is also a major training site for the medical students.

Students

There are usually five to six batches at one time and 230 students in each batch. The FMUG offers scholarship to neighbouring African and Arab countries and a good number of foreign students are enrolled on private basis.

Graduates
Thirty-three batches were graduated so far amounting to over 3,660 doctors working in the Sudan and abroad. Many of the graduates are staff members in FMUG.

International links
The school has a strong international links and the following are examples:

Network - TUFH, T
The Network is an international NGO collaborating with WHO and other organizations. FMUG is a founding member and a full member in the Network. Two of the staff were executive committee members 1983-1984/1993-1997. Two of the students of FMUG were executive committee members, the current 2019-2021 student network organization (SNO) international president is Yassein Elhussein "finalists student at FMUG". FMUG is constantly participating in the TUFH annual conferences since its establishment. About 200 abstracts have been submitted and presented in posters sessions. The faculty delegation included students and a community representative (this is unique to FMUG delegate since 2000).

WHO
There is close collaboration between the WHO and the school through the following:
 	Educational Development Centre (EDC). This is a collaborative centre with WHO
 	WHO partly sponsors community activities
 	WHO is a member of the administrative committee for the Blue Nile Institute for Training and Research

Other institutes
 	Suez Canal University, Egypt (before its establishment and up to now)
 	College of Physicians and Surgeons, Pakistan (since 1980, Gezira founding dean helped in establishing and up to now, helped in establishing and development of its EDC)
 	Columbia University, USA
 	Maastricht University, Netherlands
 	McMaster University, Canada
 	Arab Board for Medical Specializations
 	University of Dundee, U.K.
 	University of Manchester, U.K. (became community-oriented in 1994)
 	University of Sciences and Technology, and Faculty of Medicine, Taiz, Yemen (Gezira staff have helped establishment on innovative basis)
 	College of Medicine, Arab Gulf University, Bahrain
 	Centre for Education Development (CED) now Dept. of Medical Education at the Medical Centre, University of Illinois, Chicago, USA.
 	Faculty of Medicine and Health Sciences King Saud University, Abha
 	Dubai Medical College for Girls (the Gezira curriculum was provided to the founding dean in contribution to the initial curriculum planning)

Services provided by the school

Educational Development Centre

Established in 1978 with the enrollment of the first batch of students, it is the only national centre collaborating with WHO. Its main objectives are:
 	Staff development
	Strengthening the educational media support
 	Strengthening the evaluation tools
 	Develop and implement a strategy for Arabicization of the curriculum
 	Conduct periodic curriculum reviews and evaluations
 	Teacher training and evaluation in curriculum of paramedicals.
 	Strengthening the health area team approach.
 	Helping other medical schools in COME/CBE/PBL curriculum development
 	Conduct national workshops on COMB/CBE and PBL
 	Strengthening the national health programme

Activities:
 	Educational workshops
 	Curriculum development workshops
 	Curriculum evaluation workshops 2 times
 	Workshop for teachers from medical schools in Iran
 	Curriculum revision of FMUG three times
 	Review of anaesthesia curriculum
 	Design of FMUG examination office
 	Workshops on problem based learning four times
 	Curriculum design for the following:
	Faculty of Medicine, Darfur (El Fashir) University, Sudan
 	Problem-based learning in Faculty of Medicine Ahfad University for Women, Sudan
 	Faculty of Medicine University of Science and Technology, Yemen
	Village midwives’ school, Sudan
	Nurse midwives’ school, Sudan
 	Postgraduate in Forensic Medicine, Sudan National Board for Medical Specialization
	Faculty of Applied Medical Sciences U of G, Sudan
	Faculty of Medicine University of Sennar, Sudan
	Faculty of Medicine, International University of Africa, Sudan
	Curriculum of medical assistants, Sudan.

The centre runs the following courses periodically for the new and old staff of the faculty and the neighbouring by health sciences institutes:
	Instructional methods
	Evaluation methods
	Educational planning of COME
	Instructional/evaluation methods and planning for community-oriented medical school
	Baby-friendly hospital initiative training courses I, II & III.
	Arabicization of FMUG curriculum I, II & III
	Evaluation of Arabicization workshop
	Leadership development workshop
	Health insurance workshops I and II
	Workshop in reproductive health
	Institutionalization of partnership with the health system and community
	Course training for health visitors in reproductive health
	Workshop on prevention of malaria

Primary Health Care and Health Education Centre
The centre was established in 1995 as a result of joining of the primary health care centre (established in 1985 in collaboration with Columbia University) and the health education centre (established in 1986 in collaboration with WHO). The main objectives of the centre are to improve the primary health care and health education services management, research and resources.

Activities of the Centre:
 Training courses in primary health care and health management. 38 courses were conducted for 900 trainees (doctors and other health professionals)
 Formation of health area policy which was then adopted as a national system for the health service in Sudan.
 Training courses in health area management. 28 courses for a total of 112 health teams.
 Four training courses in health education for the EMRO Region of WHO
 Diploma of public health and master's degree of health education in collaboration with the postgraduates studies department.

Health-related services
 	Initiation of the health area policy from the Rural Residency Course and adoption on a national scale by the health system.
 	Partnership with regional Ministry of Health.

Institute of Nuclear Medicine, Molecular Biology and Oncology
It is a diagnostic, treating and training centre established in 1995. It has four departments: Department of Nuclear Medicine, Department of Oncology and Radiotherapy. Department of Medical Radiation physics and Department of Molecular Biology.

Blue Nile Research and Training Institute
Started its activity in 1995 as a continuation of the Blue Nile Health Project 1980-1990, as an academic institute under supervision of FMUG with collaboration of WHO and state Ministry of Health. The main activities of the centre focus on malaria as a major health problem in Sudan. The intended persons are doctors and other health and health-related personnel.

Community development
The school participates through its intra and extra-curriculum activities in community, involving mobilization and development

Student training
The students of FMUG are trained in all community levels; 300 villages were covered through the interdisciplinary Field Training Research and Rural Development Programme and more than 1,500 families were covered through the Primary Health Care Centre Practice and Family Medicine Programme.

Activities in the villages
In a study in 30 villages presented recently in the Net-work conference, Brazil 2001 the students activities were as follows:
-	Establishment and development of water resource in 17 villages
-	Establishment and development of health units in 10 villages
-	Help in introduction of electricity in one village
-	Establishment of 2 classroom in a school
-	Establishment of T.B. prevention unit
-	Health education programme and environmental health programmes in all the villages.
-	Indicators of results of student intervention
(Referring to  the above-mentioned study)
-	Increase percentage of use of pure water
-	Increase percentage of use of gas instead of charcoal and wood
-	Increase percentage of use of latrines
-	Increase percentage of use of insecticides in homes
-	Increase percentage of use of antenatal care services
-	Decrease incidence rate of diarrhoeal diseases, febrile illnesses and ARI in children less than 5 years.
-	Decrease in the incidence rate of malaria and bilharziasis
-	Impact of student’s training on the families
-	1500 families were covered through the PHCCP & FM modules. The families got great benefit from the student raining.
In study presented in the Network conference, Brazil 2001.
-	68% of students assisted in solving the families’ problems (health, economic or social problems)
-	88% of the families used some of the elements of PHC as a result of intervention by students
-	82% of the students applied the element of the PHC in solving the family problems.
Staff activities
-	Participate with community in all cultural and social aspects
-	Responding to seasonal crisis and disasters
-	Involvement in rural development committees

Postgraduate activities

The FMUG offers postgraduate degrees in both professional and social and health sciences either separately or in collaboration with the Sudan Council for Medical Specialties:

 	Diploma of Public Health
 	Master in Health Education
 	Master's degree in Biochemistry
 	Master's degree in Physiology
 	Master's degree in Dermatology
 	Master's degree in Parasitology
 	Ph.D. Biochemistry
 	M.D. Dermatology
 	Ph.D. Parasitology
 	M.D. Surgery
 	M.D. Pathology
 	M.D. Medicine
 	M.D. Paediatrics
 	M.D. Obs/gynae
	M.D. Community Medicine

References

External links
High Ministry of Education in Sudan

Gezira
Science and technology in Sudan
Scientific organisations based in Sudan
Educational institutions established in 1975